Royal free city or free royal city (Latin:  libera regia civitas) was the official term for the most important cities in the Kingdom of Hungary from the late 12th century until the Hungarian Revolution of 1848. These cities were granted certain privileges by the king to rule out the possibility of the control of the Hungarian nobility, hence "royal", and exercised some self-government in relation to their internal affairs, hence "free". From the late 14th century, the elected envoys of the Royal free cities participated in the sessions of the Hungarian parliament, thus they became part of the legislature. The list include also cities in the Kingdom of Croatia and the Banate of Bosnia, which were part of the Lands of the Hungarian Crown.

The term "royal free city" in the languages of the kingdom is: 

The status was similar to the Free Cities in the Holy Roman Empire.

List of Free Royal Cities in the Kingdom of Hungary

Towns with only partial privileges

See also
 List of free royal cities of Croatia
Administrative divisions of the Kingdom of Hungary
Free city (disambiguation)
Free Royal Cities Act
Royal city in Poland

References

Kingdom of Hungary